Ronnie Gafney (born March 11, 1980) is an American-Israeli footballer.

Though born in the United States, his family moved back to Israel in 1988 where he started to play organized football. His developmental years were spent at Maccabi Tel Aviv, where he made his professional debut during the 1998–99 season in a match against Hapoel Tzafririm Holon. Though he could not break the first team on a regular basis as Dedi Ben Dayan was just coming into his own, so Gafni headed to Hapoel Petah Tikva where he languished on the bench. His move to Bnei Yehuda gave him playing time, and he even scored a game-winning goal in the 2002–03 season against his future club Beitar Jerusalem. Eventually he was recognized as being one of the best left backs in all of Israel at that time. He was rewarded with an appearance at the end of the Avraham Grant send off game versus Denmark.

Honours
Israeli Premier League (2):
2006-07
2008-09

External links
Stats at Bnei Yehuda's official website

1980 births
Living people
American emigrants to Israel
Israeli Jews
Jewish American sportspeople
Israeli footballers
Israel international footballers
Maccabi Tel Aviv F.C. players
Hapoel Petah Tikva F.C. players
Bnei Yehuda Tel Aviv F.C. players
Beitar Jerusalem F.C. players
Maccabi Haifa F.C. players
Israeli Premier League players
Association football defenders
21st-century American Jews